The 1991 Seattle Seahawks season was the team's 16th season with the National Football League (NFL). The 1991 season was the last season for head coach Chuck Knox, who left to become head coach of the Los Angeles Rams while president and general manager Tom Flores replaced him.

The Seahawks defense, led by future hall of Famer Cortez Kennedy, finished 8th on the season in both yards and scoring. This season was the last time a team played the same team in back to back games until the 2021 season when the Cleveland Browns played the Baltimore Ravens back to back, with a bye week in between.

Offseason

NFL Draft

Personnel

Staff

Final roster

     Starters in bold.
 (*) Denotes players that were selected for the 1992 Pro Bowl.

Schedule

Preseason

Source: Seahawks Media Guides

Regular season
Divisional matchups have the AFC West playing the NFC West.

Bold indicates division opponents.
Source: 1991 NFL season results

Standings

Game Summaries

Preseason

Week P1: vs. Phoenix Cardinals

Week P2: at Indianapolis Colts

Week P3: at Los Angeles Rams

Week P4: vs. San Francisco 49ers

Regular season

Week 1: at New Orleans Saints

Week 2: vs. New York Jets

Week 3: at Denver Broncos

Week 4: at Kansas City Chiefs

Week 5: vs. Indianapolis Colts

Week 6: at Cincinnati Bengals

Week 7: vs. Los Angeles Raiders

Week 8: at Pittsburgh Steelers

Week 9: vs. San Diego Chargers

Week 11: at San Diego Chargers

Week 12: at Los Angeles Raiders

Week 13: vs. Denver Broncos

Week 14: vs. Kansas City Chiefs

Week 15: vs. San Francisco 49ers

Week 16: at Atlanta Falcons

Week 17: vs. Los Angeles Rams

References

External links
 Seahawks draft history at NFL.com
 1991 NFL season results at NFL.com

Seattle
Seattle Seahawks seasons
Seattle